The St. Galler Bratwurst, also known as the Olma Bratwurst after OLMA (the agricultural show where it is served as a staple) is a sausage produced in Northeastern Switzerland. It is partly made with veal and has a white color. It is named after the city of St. Gallen.

The St. Galler Bratwurst is produced in the cantons of St. Gallen, Appenzell Innerrhoden, Appenzell Ausserrhoden and Thurgau. It is made with pork and veal meat. It also contains fresh milk, which gives it its distinctive white color. The sausage is flavored with a variety of spices, including cardamom, coriander, ginger, nutmeg, onion, leek, celery and lemon.

In the 1438 statutes of the Butchers' Guild of St. Gallen, it is stipulated that this sausage must be produced with veal, bacon, spices and fresh milk. The recipe has not changed since. Today it is protected by an IGP label.

It is commonly eaten as street food with very few accompaniments, such as bread and mustard. But is also part of several popular dishes, a notable example being rösti with veal sausage and onion sauce. Veal sausages, including the St. Galler, are the most popular sausages for grilling in Switzerland.

References

See also
Bratwurst
Swiss sausages and cured meats
Cervelat, another popular Swiss grilling sausage
Schüblig, another popular Swiss grilling sausage

Swiss sausages
Culinary Heritage of Switzerland
Swiss cuisine
Canton of St. Gallen